Eagle's Landing High School is a high school located in McDonough, Georgia, United States. It is operated by the Henry County School System. Eagle's Landing was founded in 1990. Today, the school has 1,382 students enrolled in grades 9-12 and is accredited by the Southern Association of Colleges and Schools. The school is home to an active NJROTC program, a nationally acclaimed band, and varsity sports teams that compete in the AAAA, region 4 of the Georgia High School Association.

Athletics

 JV/varsity Golden Eagles football
 JV/varsity Golden Eagles basketball
 JV/varsity Lady Eagles basketball
 Lady Eagles volleyball
 Cross country
 Track
 Lady Eagles softball
 JV/varsity Golden Eagles baseball
 JV/varsity Golden Eagles soccer
 JV/varsity Eagles Landing Girls Lacrosse

Notable alumni
Antonio Gibson - professional football player
Matt Murton - former professional baseball player
J.R. Pinnock - former professional basketball player

References

External links
 Eagle's Landing High School

Public high schools in Georgia (U.S. state)
Schools in Henry County, Georgia
Educational institutions established in 1990
1990 establishments in Georgia (U.S. state)